Priscilla Opoku Agyeman, popularly known as "Ahuofe Patri" (born March 1991) is a Ghanaian Actress and Women's Advocate.

Education 
Priscilla is a graduate of National Film And Television Institute (Nafti).

Career 
She began her career after becoming part of the final 10 in the Miss Maliaka beauty pageant. She later became popularly known for her comedy skits Boys Kasa with Kalybos.

Priscilla is known for fighting for young women. She launched a mentoring and a gender equality project She power, a non governmental organization which empowers young girls against sexual abuse in Africa.

References

Living people
1991 births
20th-century Ghanaian actresses
21st-century Ghanaian actresses